The 39th Golden Bell Awards (Mandarin:第39屆金鐘獎) was held on November 26, 2004, at the Sun Yat-sen Memorial Hall, Taipei, Taiwan. The ceremony was broadcast live by EBC.

Winners and nominees
Below is the list of winners and nominees for the main categories.

References

2004
2004 television awards
2004 in Taiwan